{{Infobox settlement
| official_name                  = Central Hulu Sungai Regency
| native_name                    = Kabupaten Hulu Sungai Tengah
| settlement_type                = Regency
| motto                          = Murakata'
| image_skyline                  = Kantor Bupati Hulu Sungai Tengah.jpg
| imagesize                      = 
| image_caption                  = Central Hulu Sungai Regency government office
| image_flag                     = 
| image_shield                    = Lambang Kabupaten Hulu Sungai Tengah.png
| image_map                      = Lokasi Kalimantan Selatan Kabupaten Hulu Sungai Tengah.svg
| mapsize                        = 
| map_caption                    = Location within South Kalimantan
| pushpin_map                    = Indonesia Kalimantan#Indonesia
| subdivision_type               = Country
| subdivision_name               = Indonesia
| subdivision_type1              = Province
| subdivision_name1              = South Kalimantan
| subdivision_type3              = Capital
| subdivision_name3              = Barabai
| leader_title                   = Regent
| leader_name                    = H.A. Chairansyah
| established_title              = Established
| established_date               = 24 December 1959
| area_magnitude                 = 
| area_total_km2                 = 1770.77
| area_total_sq_mi               = 
| area_land_km2                  = 
| area_land_sq_mi                = 
| area_water_km2                 = 
| area_water_sq_mi               = 
| area_water_percent             = 
| area_urban_km2                 = 
| area_urban_sq_mi               = 
| area_metro_km2                 = 
| area_metro_sq_mi               = 
| population_as_of               = mid 2021 estimate
| population_note                = 
| population_total               = 260754
| population_density_km2         = auto
| population_density_sq_mi       = 
| population_metro               = 
| population_density_metro_km2   = 
| population_density_metro_sq_mi = 
| pushpin_map_caption            = Location in Kalimantan and Indonesia
| timezone                       = ICST
| utc_offset                     = +8
| timezone_DST                   = 
| utc_offset_DST                 = 
| coordinates                    = 
| elevation_m                    = 
| elevation_ft                   = 
| area_code                      = (+62) 517
| website                        = hulusungaitengahkab.go.id
| footnotes                      =
| leader_title1                  = Vice Regent
| leader_name1                   = vacant| area_code_type                 = Area code
}}
Central Hulu Sungai Regency is one of the regencies in the Indonesian province of South Kalimantan. The area is 1,770.77 km2 and the population was 243,460 at the 2010 Census and 258,721 at the 2020 Census; the official estimate as at mid 2021 was 260,754. The capital is the town of Barabai.

Administrative districts
Central Hulu Sungai Regency is divided into eleven districts (kecamatan), listed below with their areas and their populations at the 2010 Census and 2020 Census, together with the official estimates as at mid 2021. The table includes the locations of the district administrative centres, the number of administrative villages (rural desa and urban kelurahan'') in each district, and its post code.

References

External links 

 

Regencies of South Kalimantan